A school of mines (or mining school) is an engineering school, often established in the 18th and 19th centuries, that originally focused on mining engineering and applied science. Most have been integrated within larger constructs such as mineral engineering, some no longer focusing primarily on mining subjects, while retaining the name.

Universities offering degrees in mining engineering

Africa

Asia

|Jessore University of Science and Technology || Petroleum and Mining Engineering || Bangladesh

Europe

North America

United States

ABET-accredited Mining Engineering

Columbia School of Mines, now Fu Foundation School of Engineering and Applied Science at Columbia University, Manhattan, New York
Colorado School of Mines, Mining Engineering, Golden, Colorado
Michigan Technological University (formerly Michigan College of Mining and Technology), Houghton, Michigan)
Missouri University of Science and Technology (formerly the Missouri School of Mines & Metallurgy), Rolla, Missouri
Montana Technological University (formerly Montana School of Mines), Butte, Montana
New Mexico Institute of Mining and Technology (formerly the New Mexico School of Mines), Socorro, New Mexico
Pennsylvania State University, University Park, Pennsylvania
South Dakota School of Mines and Technology, Rapid City, South Dakota
Southern Illinois University Carbondale, Carbondale, Illinois
University of Alaska Fairbanks, College of Engineering and Mines, Fairbanks, Alaska
University of Arizona, Department of Mining & Geological Engineering, Tucson, Arizona
University of Kentucky, Lexington, Kentucky
University of Nevada, Reno (formerly The Mackay School of Mines) Reno, Nevada
University of North Dakota, College of Engineering and Mines Grand Forks, North Dakota
University of Utah, Department of Mining Engineering, Salt Lake City, Utah
Virginia Polytechnic Institute and State University, Department of Mining and Minerals Engineering Blacksburg, Virginia
West Virginia University, in Morgantown, West Virginia

Non-ABET-accredited or other programs
 Michigan Technological University, Houghton, Michigan, offers a graduate program (MS and PhD) in Mining Engineering
 Oregon Agricultural College, now Oregon State University, Corvallis, OR, was the home of the Oregon School of Mines 1912-1932.

Canada
 Dalhousie University, Halifax, Nova Scotia
 École Polytechnique de Montréal, Montreal
 Lassonde Mineral Engineering, University of Toronto, Toronto, Ontario
 Laurentian University, Sudbury, Ontario
 Haileybury School of Mines, Northern College, Ontario
 McGill University, Montreal
 Norman B. Keevil Institute of Mining Engineering, The University of British Columbia, Vancouver
 The Robert M. Buchan Department of Mining Engineering, Queen's University at Kingston in Ontario
 Université Laval, Québec City
 University of Alberta, School of Mining & Petroleum Engineering, Edmonton, Alberta
 University of Saskatchewan, Mining Options in Geological, Chemical and Mechanical Engineering, Saskatoon
 British Columbia Institute of Technology, Mining and Mineral Resource Engineering, Burnaby

Oceania

Australia

 Division of Mining & Resources Engineering Department of Civil Engineering, Monash University, Clayton 3800, VIC
 School of Civil, Environmental and Mining Engineering, University of Adelaide, South Australia
 School of Civil, Environmental and Mining Engineering, University of Western Australia
 School of Mining Engineering, University of New South Wales, Sydney
 School of Mining Engineering, University of Queensland, Brisbane
 School of Science and Engineering, University of Ballarat, Victoria
 The South Australian School of Mines and Industries, established 1889, now part of the University of South Australia
 University of Wollongong, New South Wales
 Western Australian School of Mines, Kalgoorlie, Western Australia

New Zealand
 The Thames School of Mines
The Reefton School of Mines

South America
 Departamento de Ingeniería Metalúrgica, Universidad de Concepción, Concepción, Chile
 Mining Engineering Department, University of Chile, Santiago, Chile
 Departamento de Ingeniería de Minería, Pontificia Universidad Católica de Chile, Santiago, Chile
 Departamento de Ingeniería en Minas, Universidad de La Serena, La Serena, Chile
 Departamento de Ingeniería en Minas, Universidad de Santiago de Chile, Santiago, Chile
 Departamento de Ingeniería Metalúrgica y Minas, Universidad Católica del Norte, Antofagasta, Chile
 Departamento de Minas, Universidad de Atacama, Copiapó, Chile
Department of Mining Engineering, Universidad del Azuay, Cuenca, Ecuador, Ecuador
 Department of Mining Engineering, Universidade Federal da Bahia, Salvador, Bahia, Brazil
 Department of Mining Engineering, Universidade Federal de Minas Gerais, Belo Horizonte, Minas Gerais, Brazil
 Department of Mining Engineering, Universidade Federal de Pernambuco (UFPE), Recife, Pernambuco, Brazil
 Department of Mining Engineering, Universidade Federal do Rio Grande do Sul, Rio Grande do Sul, Brazil
 Escola de Minas de Ouro Preto, Universidade Federal de Ouro Preto, Minas Gerais, Brazil
 Escola Politécnica, Universidade de São Paulo, São Paulo, Brazil
 Faculdade de Engenharia, Universidade do Estado de Minas Gerais, João Monlevade, Brazil
 Faculdade de Engenharia Kennedy, Belo Horizonte, Brazil
 Instituto de Ciência e Tecnologia, Universidade Federal de Alfenas, Campus Poços de Caldas, Brazil
 Unidade Acadêmica de Mineração e Geologia, Universidade Federal de Campina Grande, Campina Grande, Paraíba, Brazil
 Department of Mining Engineering, Pontificia Universidad Católica del Perú, Lima, Peru
 Escuela Académico Profesional de Ingeniería de Minas, Universidad Nacional Mayor de San Marcos, Lima, Perú
 Escuela de Ingeniería de Minas, Universidad Nacional de Ingeniería, Lima, Peru
 Escuela de Minería y Gerencia de Sudamérica, Lima, Perú

 Departamento de Ingeniería de Minas, Universidad Francisco de Paula Santander, Sede Cucuta, Colombia
 Faculty of Mines, Universidad Nacional de Colombia, Sede Medellín, Colombia
 Department of Mining Engineering, Universidad De Oriente (Núcleo Bolívar), Ciudad Bolívar, Estado Bolívar, Venezuela
 Departamento de Ingeniería de Minas, Universidad Nacional de San Juan, San Juan, Argentina

See also 
 List of colleges of natural resources
 Ranking QS 2019, Subject: Engineering - Mineral and Mining.

References

 
Mine
Sc